Cytochromes are redox-active proteins containing a heme, with a central iron (Fe) atom at its core, as a cofactor. They are involved in electron transport chain and redox catalysis. They are classified according to the type of heme and its mode of binding. Four varieties are recognized by the International Union of Biochemistry and Molecular Biology (IUBMB), cytochromes a, cytochromes b, cytochromes c and cytochrome d.  

Cytochrome function is linked to the reversible redox change from ferrous (Fe(II)) to the ferric (Fe(III)) oxidation state of the iron found in the heme core.  In addition to the classification by the IUBMB into four cytochrome classes, several additional classifications such as cytochrome o and cytochrome P450 can be found in biochemical literature.

History
Cytochromes were initially described in 1884 by Charles Alexander MacMunn as respiratory pigments (myohematin or histohematin). In the 1920s, Keilin rediscovered these respiratory pigments and named them the cytochromes, or “cellular pigments”. He classified these heme proteins on the basis of the position of their lowest energy absorption band in their reduced state, as
cytochromes a (605 nm), b (≈565 nm), and c (550 nm). The ultra-violet (UV) to visible spectroscopic signatures of hemes are still used to identify heme type from the reduced bis-pyridine-ligated state, i.e., the pyridine hemochrome method. Within each class, cytochrome a, b, or c, early cytochromes are numbered consecutively, e.g. cyt c, cyt c1, and cyt c2, with more recent examples designated by their reduced state R-band maximum, e.g. cyt c559.

Structure and function
The heme group is a highly conjugated ring system (which allows its electrons to be very mobile) surrounding an iron ion. The iron in cytochromes usually exists in a ferrous (Fe2+) and a ferric (Fe3+) state with a ferroxo (Fe4+)  state found in catalytic intermediates. Cytochromes are, thus, capable of performing electron transfer reactions and catalysis by reduction or oxidation of their heme iron. The cellular location of cytochromes depends on their function. They can be found as globular proteins and membrane proteins.

In the process of oxidative phosphorylation, a globular cytochrome cc protein is involved in the electron transfer from the membrane-bound complex III to complex IV. Complex III itself is composed of several subunits, one of which is a b-type cytochrome while another one is a c-type cytochrome. Both domains are involved in electron transfer within the complex. Complex IV contains a cytochrome a/a3-domain that transfers electrons and catalyzes the reaction of oxygen to water. Photosystem II, the first protein complex in the light-dependent reactions of oxygenic photosynthesis, contains a cytochrome b subunit. Cyclooxygenase 2, an enzyme involved in inflammation, is a cytochrome b protein.

In the early 1960s, a linear evolution of cytochromes was suggested by Emanuel Margoliash that led to the molecular clock hypothesis. The apparently constant evolution rate of cytochromes can be a helpful tool in trying to determine when various organisms may have diverged from a common ancestor.

Types
Several kinds of cytochrome exist and can be distinguished by spectroscopy, exact structure of the heme group, inhibitor sensitivity, and reduction potential.

Four types of cytochromes are distinguished by their prosthetic groups:

There is no "cytochrome e," but cytochrome f, found in the cytochrome b6f complex of plants is a c-type cytochrome.

In mitochondria and chloroplasts, these cytochromes are often combined in electron transport and related metabolic pathways:

A distinct family of cytochromes is the cytochrome P450 family, so named for the characteristic Soret peak formed by absorbance of light at wavelengths near 450 nm when the heme iron is reduced (with sodium dithionite) and complexed to carbon monoxide. These enzymes are primarily involved in steroidogenesis and detoxification.

References

External links
Scripps Database of Metalloproteins